Crindau Marina is a possible development in Crindau, Newport. The marina would provide opportunities for new housing, shops and leisure facilities focused around a waterside location. Newport Unlimited, the Newport urban regeneration company, have secured £75,000 of funding from the Welsh Assembly Government’s ‘Catching the Wave’ action plan (to stimulate coastal economies in Wales), to consider the possibility of a developing a marina in Crindau. The marina would be part of the regeneration of Newport as a whole.

The marina's objectives 
 Making a feature of the Monmouthshire canal terminus in Crindau
 New housing and retail development
 Waterside leisure facilities and riverside park 
 Improved access to the area
 New business premises, where required, to accommodate new and existing businesses

References

Newport Unlimited - Crindau Gateway

Buildings and structures in Newport, Wales
Marinas in Wales